Sanskaar Laxmi is an Indian television drama series which premiered on Zee TV on 17 January 2011 to 8 September 2011. The series is based on the life of a poor village girl, Laxmi who gets married into a rich Gujarati family in Mumbai. The story shows how a less educated but worldly wise, mature and extremely talented Laxmi overcomes obstacles to settle down in her life.

Plot
Laxmi is rooted in Indian traditions and has an inborn knack for winning peoples hearts with her pleasant demeanor and sweet smile even in adverse situations. For Laxmi, 'Sanskaar' does not mean only following rituals blindly but it means caring for everyone and valuing relationships.

Laxmi enters a rich but fragmenting joint urban Purohit family based in Mumbai as their daughter-in-law and plays the central role in stopping the family from falling apart. How the Purohit family, a traditional believer in rituals and culture of Hindu religion deals with the rural, modern and ultramodern  lifestyle after bringing in their daughters-in-law; how significant a role Laxmi plays after coming in and how she overcomes her own as well as her family's trials and tribulations forms the basis of the show.

Cast
 Veebha Anand as Laxmi Angad Purohit (Angad's wife)
 Shakti Arora as Angad Purohit-Vijay and Shobhna's son
 Vivan Bhatena as Parag Purohit
 Rohit Purohit as Suraj Purohit
 Suzanne Bernert as Jennifer
 Vikas Sethi as Mandar
 Aamir Dalvi as Mahen Purohit
 Anisha Kapoor as Ragini
 Rajesh Shringarpure as Harsukh Purohit
 Anang Desai as Jagmohan Purohit-Vijay's father and Angad's grandfather
 Dharmesh Vyas as Vijay Purohit
 Falguni Parekh as Mrs. Purohit
 Prateeksha Lonkar as Kaveri Purohit
 Shafaq Naaz as Randhal
 David Moss as White boy 1
 Emmanuel Latham as Pilot 1
 Jonathon Faulkner as Pilot 2 / Check in assistant
 Ahmad Harhash as Raj Singh Rathore Check in  assistant

References

External links
Sanskaar Laxmi Official Site on Zee TV India

Zee TV original programming
Indian drama television series
Indian television soap operas
2011 Indian television series endings
2011 Indian television series debuts